Thiago Humberto Gomes (born July 6, 1985 in Lins), usually known as Thiago Humberto, is a Brazilian football attacking midfielder, who plays for Linense.

Titles

São Paulo A3 State League: 2005
São Paulo A2 State League: 2006
São Paulo Interior League: 2008

External links

 

1985 births
Living people
Footballers from São Paulo (state)
Brazilian footballers
Campeonato Brasileiro Série A players
Campeonato Brasileiro Série B players
Campeonato Brasileiro Série D players
Grêmio Barueri Futebol players
Sport Club Internacional players
Ceará Sporting Club players
Goiás Esporte Clube players
América Futebol Clube (MG) players
Criciúma Esporte Clube players
Paraná Clube players
Esporte Clube Novo Hamburgo players
Clube Atlético Linense players
Grêmio Novorizontino players
Association football forwards
People from Lins, São Paulo